The Edmonton Oilers are a franchise in the National Hockey League (NHL), based in Edmonton, Alberta, Canada.  They originated as one of the twelve founding franchises of the World Hockey Association (WHA) in 1972, remaining with the league until it ceased operation after the 1978–79 season.  The Oilers were one of four remaining WHA franchises to be admitted to the NHL as expansion teams for the 1979–80 season.

 Sixteen of those NHL Oilers also played at least one game for the WHA Oilers.

Kevin Lowe, the Oilers' first ever NHL draft pick, is the leader for both regular season (1,037) and playoff (172) games in an Oilers uniform, for an overall Oilers-leading total of 1,209 games. Amongst goaltenders, Grant Fuhr is the overall leader for total games played as an Oiler, with 534, which includes a team-leading 111 playoff games; goaltender Bill Ranford is the leader for regular season (449) games played. There have been 25 players (16 skaters and 9 goaltenders) who have played only one gamein all cases, one regular season gamewith the NHL Oilers.

The Oilers have won the Stanley Cup five times, with 48 players winning the Cup as an Oiler.  Seven players (Glenn Anderson, Grant Fuhr, Randy Gregg, Charlie Huddy, Jari Kurri, Kevin Lowe and Mark Messier) were members of all five Cup-winning teams. 
Eight players from the NHL years have gone on to be elected into the Hockey Hall of Fame, most recently Chris Pronger in June 2015. Another three ex-Oilers who only played for the WHA franchise are also in the Hall of Fame.  The Oilers have retired the numbers of seven players.

Key

Seasons Lists the first year of the season of the player's first game and the last year of the season of the player's last game of consecutive tenure. For example, a player who played one game in the 2000–01 NHL season would be listed as playing with the team from 2000–2001, regardless of what calendar year the game occurred within. Players who leave and return will show more than one consecutive period. This list includes all players that have played at least one regular season or playoff game for the Edmonton Oilers in the NHL since the 1979–80 season.  It does not include any players who only played for the team as a franchise in the WHA from 1972 to 1979.

Goaltenders
Note: Statistics are complete through the 2021–22 season.

Skaters

Note: Statistics are complete through the 2021–22 season.

See also
List of Edmonton Oilers (WHA) players

References

 
Edmonton Oilers
players